Impach, Washington is an unincorporated populated place in east central Ferry County, Washington on the Colville Indian Reservation. It is located within the Inchelium CDP.

Historically, Impach has been the site of traditional Native American dance ceremonies by members of the confederated tribes. Gold was discovered in Ferry County in 1896 and several gold mines operated in the Impach area as late as the 1950s, including the nearby Gold Twenty Mine which produced lode gold, lead, and silver. During the early 1930s, a predecessor of the Works Progress Administration established a small logging operation in Impach, which brought some unemployed families to the area at the height of the Great Depression. A United States post office operated at Impach, Washington, from 1922 to 1954. The scenic valley is primarily grazing land today.

References

External links
Flickriver, United States/Washington/Impach, photos of Impach and the Seylor Valley
Panoramio, aerial photos of Impach and vicinity

Populated places in Ferry County, Washington
Populated places in the Okanagan Country